Bruce Vee Hurst (born March 24, 1958) is an American former Major League Baseball left-handed starting pitcher. He is best remembered for his performance for the Boston Red Sox in the  postseason, where he won two games while allowing only two runs total. Prior to the miraculous Game 6 comeback by the New York Mets, he was the presumed World Series MVP. Two days later, in Game 7, Hurst was sent out to pitch the decisive game for the Sox, but he left with a no-decision when Boston saw a three run lead turn into a tie in the sixth with Hurst on the mound (New York eventually won the game and the Series); Hurst pitched a total of 23 innings, most among any pitcher in the Series and allowed five earned runs.

Early life
Hurst grew up in St. George, Utah, the youngest of five children born to John and Beth Hurst who divorced when he was five years old. At an early age, doctors prescribed plaster casts to correct a condition that was causing his legs to bow.

Hurst was a standout basketball player, leading Dixie High School to the state tournament in his junior and senior seasons, despite suffering a cracked vertebra as a senior, and would receive basketball scholarship offers. He played basketball at Dixie Junior College for the 1979-80 season. In 2015, Hurst told The Boston Globe that he would shoot hoops at Boston Celtics practices during his Red Sox days after developing a friendship with Celtics guard Danny Ainge.

Hurst has attributed his early interest and development in baseball to a local coach and former Brigham Young University player who had him analyze magazine photos of pitcher windups, with Hurst practicing his own windup in front of a three-way mirror. Hurst caught the eye of MLB scouts after his junior year during an American Legion state tournament. He would average 14 strikeouts a game as a senior, compiling a 24-2 record for his prep career.

Minor league career
Hurst was selected by the Red Sox with the 22nd overall pick in the 1976 Major League Baseball draft, the 11th pitcher selected. The Red Sox assigned him to the Elmira Pioneers of the New York-Penn League, where Hurst was 3-2 with a 3.00 earned run average across nine starts.

Hurst spent the 1977 season with the Winter Haven Red Sox in the Florida State League, going 5-4 in 13 starts with a 2.08 ERA, before incurring an elbow injury.

In 1978, the Red Sox promoted Hurst to the Bristol Red Sox of the Eastern League, where he lodged six starts before having his season shut down with shoulder soreness, ending with a 1-3 record and a 2.73 ERA.

Hurst started the 1979 season with Winter Haven, going 8-2 across 12 starts with a 1.93 ERA, then finishing the year in Bristol where across 15 starts and one relief appearance he had a 9-4 record with a 3.58 ERA.

After making Boston's opening day roster in 1980, Hurst struggled and was reassigned to the Pawtucket Red Sox of the International League. He went 8-6 for Pawtucket over the next three months with a 3.94 ERA, with Boston recalling him in August to the parent club.

Returning to Pawtucket for the  season, Hurst went 12-7 with a 2.87 ERA, getting a call-up to Boston in September. That season he played in the longest professional baseball game in history against the Rochester Red Wings, with 32 innings played April 18–19 and the final inning not played until June 23. Hurst came on in relief for the 28th inning and pitched five innings without giving up a run, later recollecting striking out Cal Ripken Jr. on a breaking ball at 4 a.m. prior to the league's commissioner ordering the suspension of play at the end of the inning. Bob Ojeda was credited with the win after pitching the 33rd inning on June 23.

Boston Red Sox
Hurst made his major league debut on April 12, 1980, coming on in relief in the second game of the season and giving up five earned runs in an inning of work in an 18-1 blowout at the hands of the Milwaukee Brewers. He made six more appearances, all starts, before being optioned back to Pawtucket with a 10.57 ERA. He returned to the majors in August, ending the season with a 2-2 record and 9.10 ERA at the major league level.

After spending the 1981 minor league season in Pawtucket, Hurst received a September call-up, going 2-0 in five starts with a 4.30 ERA.

Hurst became a regular in the Red Sox rotation in the 1982 season, starting 19 games with another nine relief appearances en route to a 3-7 record and a 5.77 ERA. He solidified his starting status the following season, going 12-12 with a 4.09 ERA across 32 starts and one relief appearance.

With the departures of John Tudor and Dennis Eckersley, Hurst became Boston's top starter in 1984, getting the nod on opening day and giving up two unearned runs in 8 and a third innings in a 2-1 road loss to the California Angels. He bounced back with a four-hit shutout of the Oakland A's, then was chased from his Fenway Park home opener after giving up seven runs while recording only a single out. Hurst was 12-12 on the season with a 3.92 ERA, tying with Ojeda and Oil Can Boyd for the team lead in wins.

Getting off to a slow start in the 1985 season, Hurst was demoted to the bullpen for a portion of June and requested a trade. Hurst turned around his season with the addition of a forkball as a third pitch to his curveball and fastball. Hurst credited former Detroit Tigers coach Roger Craig for teaching him the concept of the forkball and former Baltimore Orioles pitcher Mike Boddicker for schooling him in the grip, confirmed later by Boddicker who described the pitch as a "foshball" that was essentially "a glorified changeup."

In an interview snippet broadcast on NBC's coverage of the second inning of game one of the World Series, Hurst said that provided his curve and forkball were fooling hitters, "I think I can get by with a mediocre fastball." Hurst would later pinpoint his revival to a single moment during a July 3 game against Milwaukee when batter Paul Molitor easily fouled off a Hurst pitch, at which point Hurst recollected telling himself "no more" and bore down to get the strikeout, one of 10 that day for the first time in his career. With his ERA having peaked at 6.66 on June 23, Hurst would finish the season with an overall 4.51 ERA and an 11-13 record.

Hurst had gone 42-46 with a 4.59 ERA with the Red Sox before his breakthrough 1986 season, on a staff anchored by Cy Young Award winner Roger Clemens. Hurst posted a 2.99 ERA with 13 victories despite spending six midsummer weeks on the disabled list with a pulled groin. The Red Sox won the American League East by 5.5 games over the New York Yankees to head to the 1986 American League Championship Series against the California Angels. Hurst went 1-0 with a 2.40 ERA in two starts in the ALCS won by the Sox in seven games.

1986 World Series
Hurst pitched brilliantly in the World Series, holding the New York Mets to just four hits in the Game 1 pitchers' duel with Ron Darling won 1-0 by the Red Sox. In Game 5, Hurst pitched a complete game victory to give Boston a 3-2 lead in the Series.

With Boston winning 5-3 in the tenth inning of Game 6, the Mets were down to their last out with no one on base. A Red Sox World Series victory seemed all but a certainty as the Shea Stadium scoreboard was set to display "Congratulations Boston Red Sox, 1986 World Champions". Hurst had been selected as the World Series Most Valuable Player until the Mets rallied to win the game with three runs, forcing a decisive Game 7.

Oil Can Boyd was originally slated to be the Game 7 starter for Boston, but when the game was delayed a day by rain, manager John McNamara bumped him in favor of Hurst. Hurst gave up just one hit through five innings of work, however, the Mets came back with three runs in the sixth to tie the game. Hurst got a no-decision as he handed the ball over to the bullpen. The Mets won the World Championship, and Ray Knight received MVP honors.

Return to the postseason
Hurst had a 9-6 record and 3.81 ERA when his manager added him to the  American League All-Star team, however, he did not appear in the game. He ended the season at a not-so-brilliant 15-13 as the Red Sox finished the season 20 games behind the first place Detroit Tigers.

Hurst was 9-4 with a 4.60 ERA midway through the  season when the Red Sox replaced McNamara at manager with Joe Morgan, who had been Pawtucket manager during Hurst's tenure there. The Sox were in fifth place, nine games back of the first place Tigers at the time of the managerial change. The team went 46-31 from that point forward to finish one game ahead of Detroit in the AL East.

Hurst went 9-2 with a 2.54 ERA under his new manager to end the season at 18-6, finishing fifth in balloting for the American League Cy Young Award that season. He pitched a complete game in Games 1 of the 1988 American League Championship Series against the Oakland Athletics, but was outmatched by Oakland's ace, Dave Stewart. With Boston down three games to none, the two faced off again in Game 4 with Stewart and the A's again emerging victorious to complete the sweep.

San Diego Padres
Hurst chose to leave the Sox as a free agent following the 1988 season, and signed a three-year contract with the San Diego Padres worth $5.25 million. Hurst indicated at the time that San Diego's relative proximity to St. George was the primary factor in his decision to leave Boston, and later expressed regret in leaving the Red Sox.

On April 10, he pitched a one-hitter against the Atlanta Braves for his first National League win and also collected his first MLB hit as a batter. He went 15-11 with a career-best 2.69 ERA that season and led the National League in complete games with 10.

On May 18, 1992, Hurst pitched a one-hit shutout over Dwight Gooden and the Mets. The only hit was a single by Chico Walker. At the end of the season, he began to feel pain in his left shoulder and underwent surgery to repair a torn rotator cuff and labrum. The rehabilitation was an arduous process, and Hurst ended making just two starts for the Padres in  before being traded to the Colorado Rockies on July 26 with Greg Harris for Brad Ausmus, Doug Bochtler and Andy Ashby. He pitched just three games for Colorado.

Hurst signed with the Texas Rangers for the  season. He was 2-1 with a 7.11 ERA in eight starts through June, but with the repercussions of the surgery still lingering, he decided to retire mid season.

Career stats

Consistently good but never overpowering hitters, Hurst was a specialist at changing speeds. His fastball was hard enough to get in on right-handed hitters, and he mixed it with an excellent curve and a slider as well. He also had a decent forkball at times. Thanks to his great control, Hurst was able to work corners well and had a profuse knowledge of each hitter. In seven post-season games he had a 3-2 record with 37 strikeouts and a 2.29 ERA.

Post-playing activities
Hurst was inducted to the Boston Red Sox Hall of Fame in November , on the heels of the Red Sox 2004 World Series victory, the club's first since 1918. Believers of "The Curse of the Bambino" have pointed out the letters "BRUCE HURST" can be re-arranged as "B RUTH CURSE". With his mother Beth having died in December 2003 on the eve of the Red Sox World Series win in 2004, Hurst was quoted saying years later, "I'm pretty sure, knowing my mom, that she would have gone up and put her arm around Babe and said, 'Let's get this over with.'" 

In , Hurst and Jim Lefebvre coached China to a bronze medal at the 23rd Asian Baseball Championship, which was the first time ever that China had defeated one of the "Big Three" Asian teams (Japan, South Korea, Chinese Taipei). In , Hurst and Lefebvre also led the Chinese team in the inaugural World Baseball Classic, where they were eliminated in the first round of competition in the Asian bracket, which also featured eventual tournament champion Japan, as well as Korea and Chinese Taipei. In the Asian Baseball Championship in 2012 and World Baseball Classic in 2013, alongside manager John McLaren, Hurst also coached Team China.

Hurst returned to the Boston Red Sox during spring training in 2008 as a pitching instructor. On February 26, 2008, Hurst was named as Special Assistant for Player Development with the Red Sox.

During a 2019 Pawtucket Red Sox Hall of Fame induction ceremony for Clemens, the former pitcher credited Hurst for giving him the nickname "Rocketman" during their playing days. In 2015, Hurst described Clemens as "the greatest teammate ever" in an interview with a Boston Globe columnist.

Personal life
Hurst met spouse Holly in 1979 during offseason studies at the Dixie College predecessor to Dixie State University in St. George. The couple married the year he graduated in 1981 and parented four children. Hurst was inducted into Dixie State's athletic hall of fame in 2011, and the school's baseball field is named for him.

In 1999, Bruce and Holly Hurst moved to Gilbert, Arizona.

Throughout his career, Hurst identified himself as a Mormon.

References

External links 

Bruce Hurst at Baseball Library

American League All-Stars
Boston Red Sox players
Colorado Rockies players
San Diego Padres players
Texas Rangers players
Major League Baseball pitchers
1958 births
Living people
People from St. George, Utah
Baseball players from Utah
Elmira Pioneers players
Winter Haven Red Sox players
Bristol Red Sox players
Pawtucket Red Sox players
Rancho Cucamonga Quakes players
Las Vegas Stars (baseball) players
Colorado Springs Sky Sox players
Charlotte Rangers players
Oklahoma City 89ers players